Cornelius Lucas (born July 18, 1991) is an American football offensive tackle for the Washington Commanders of the National Football League (NFL). He played college football at Kansas State and signed with the Detroit Lions as an undrafted free agent in 2014. Lucas has also been a member of the Los Angeles Rams, New Orleans Saints, and Chicago Bears.

College career
Cornelius played college football for Bill Snyder at Kansas State and started at left tackle.

Professional career

Detroit Lions
Lucas was signed by the Detroit Lions as an undrafted free agent on May 12, 2014. He played in 35 games and started six for the Lions from 2014 to 2016. As an exclusive-rights free agent, he was tendered by the Lions on March 9, 2017. On September 3, 2017, Lucas was waived by the Lions.

Los Angeles Rams
On September 12, 2017, Lucas was signed by the Los Angeles Rams. He made his first and only start of the season in the Week 17 matchup against the 49ers at right tackle.

On April 16, 2018, Lucas re-signed with the Rams. He was released on August 31, 2018.

New Orleans Saints
On December 20, 2018, Lucas was signed by the New Orleans Saints, but was released two days later. He was re-signed on December 27, 2018, but was released four days later.

Chicago Bears

On January 23, 2019, Lucas signed a reserve/future contract with the Chicago Bears. In Week 3 of the 2019 season, he started at right tackle in place of an ailing Bobby Massie; the Bears went on to win 31–15. During the year, he also saw action on tackle-eligible plays as an extra blocker.

Washington Football Team / Commanders
On March 27, 2020, Lucas signed with the Washington Football Team. Lucas started at left tackle in place of an injured Geron Christian in the Week 7 win against the Dallas Cowboys. He started the next two games, but was forced to leave in the second half of the Week 10 game against the Detroit Lions due to an injury. He missed the next two games, returning in Week 13 and started at left tackle for the rest of the season.

On December 15, 2021, Lucas was placed on the COVID-19 reserve list. After missing the Week 15 game against the Philadelphia Eagles, he was placed back on the active roster on December 22. 

Lucas re-signed with the team on a two-year contract on March 24, 2022. He was placed on the active/non-football injury list at the start of training camp in 2022; he was activated on August 15. In Week 5 of the 2022 season, Lucas was named as the starting right tackle in place of Sam Cosmi, who had thumb surgery, and continued to start even when Cosmi began playing again three weeks later.

References

External links
Washington Commanders bio
Kansas State Wildcats bio

1991 births
Living people
Players of American football from New Orleans
American football offensive tackles
Kansas State Wildcats football players
Detroit Lions players
Los Angeles Rams players
New Orleans Saints players
Chicago Bears players
Washington Commanders players
Washington Football Team players